Big Brother Brasil 13 was the thirteenth season of Big Brother Brasil, which premiered January 8, 2013, and the season finale airing March 26, 2013, on the Globo television network.

The show was produced by Endemol Globo and presented by Pedro Bial. The thirteenth season was officially confirmed since March 2012 as part of a millionaire contract between international Endemol and Globo, which guaranteed seasons until 2016.

The grand prize was R$1.5 million with tax allowances, with a R$150,000 prize offered to the runner up and a R$50,000 prize offered to the 3rd placed housemate. The season was the first to be broadcast in HD and the first to be broadcast in 3D worldwide.

As part of the twist for this season, six (seven later) former housemates re-entered the Big Brother House for another chance to win the grand prize, bringing the total number of finalists to twenty-one. Fani Pacheco was the only veteran to place higher than in her original season (7th to 6th) while other returnees ranked lower.

Production

Cast
Regional applications were due from March 30, 2012 to July 30, 2012. Regional auditions were held in nine different cities over Brazil.

National applications started on July 31, 2012 until October 31, 2012. The semi-finalist interviews were held in November 2012 and the final casting interviews took place early in December 2012.

The Game

Glass House
On January 5, 2013, six housemates were locked for seven days in a Glass House located at Santana Parque Shopping in São Paulo. It was announced that Marcello received the most votes among the males, while Kamilla received the most votes among the females. Both therefore left the Glass House on January 11, 2013, and entered the main house on January 14, 2013.

Veterans vs. Newbies
For the first Head of Household (HoH) competition of the season, Big Brother divided the housemates into two teams: the Veterans and the Newbies. When a housemate from a team won the role of the Head of Household, then all members of that team were automatically immune from eviction.

Bambam's withdrawal
On January 12, 2013, Big Brother Brasil 1 winner and current HoH at the time, Bambam, walked out of the game. At the live show on the same day, the Veterans decided as a group that Fani would be the new HoH. Following that, Yuri Fernandes from Big Brother Brasil 12 entered the house as Bambam's replacement.

Power of No
Introduced in previous season, the Power of No still gives the Monday Game Night winner, the opportunity to disqualify a number of people (previously determined by the producers) from competing in the Head of Household competition alongside the previous HoH. This season however, started on week 4, the vetoed housemates could remove themselves from the block and compete for HoH if they win the Save Me Challenge, which takes place on Wednesdays nights.

Big Brother Back and Forth
On week 3, after a fake Head of Household competition, housemates were told there's gonna be a surprise eviction. The housemate with the most votes would be immediately evicted on Saturday, January 26.

In reality, the public voted for which housemate between the two fake nominees Anamara and Marcello, would enter the Secret Room and be able to watch their fellow housemates on a television screen, and then return to the house on Sunday, as the real HoH of the week. Anamara won with 57% and was fake evicted on day 19, but returned the following day during the real live nominations.

Big Phone

Appeared and Disappeared
On February 14, 2013, Big Brother revealed to the public that the first housemate to go into the pantry on Saturday, February 16, would be secretly taken out of the house for a day at a spa. Around 10:00am, Kamilla was the first to be entered the pantry and 'disappeared' from the house, leaving the remaining housemates worried about her whereabouts. At 7:00pm, producers told the housemates to pack Kamilla's belongings to lead them thinking she was out of the game. Around 11:30pm, Kamilla finally returned to the house during the Disco party and then, explained to her shocked fellow housemates what happened to her.

Running Against Time
On February 21, 2013, Big Brother revealed to the public that the Big Phone would rang on Friday, February 22 at 6:00am. Whoever answered would be automatically nominated for eviction. At 12:00pm, a giant stopwatch counting down 20 hours would be placed in the garden. On top of it there would be a button. The first housemate who pressed the button would stop the countdown and win a surprise immunity. However, if the housemate who was previously nominated by the Big Phone pressed the button, this housemate would win the immunity and choose his replacement nominee. At 6:00am, Eliéser answered the Big Phone and was automatically nominated. At 12:03pm, Fernanda pressed the button and stopped the countdown but she was only informed about her immunity during the live nominations on February 24, 2013.

The Mystery Box
On March 7, 2013, Big Brother announced the first twist of week 9. On Friday, March 8, at 12:00pm, a mystery box would be placed in the garden. To open the mystery box, the housemates would have to find the right key, between thirty hidden keys scattered throughout the outdoor area of the house. The first housemate who opened the box would win a R$10.000 cash prize, choose one housemate to be automatically nominated for eviction and veto other two housemates from the Power of Immunity competition.

The mystery box ended up being placed in the house only at 2:30pm due this week's HoH endurance competition overrun. Andressa and Kamilla found the box in the garden around 3:30pm. Andressa beat Kamilla and found right key first, winning the challenge.

It's Not What It Seems
Also on March 7, Big Brother revealed the second twist of week 9: new housemate Miguel, supposedly from Gran Hermano Argentina, entered the house on March 8. However, in reality, he was an actor working for Big Brother. His mission was told the housemates that he would choose one of them to win immunity and spend a week in the Argentinian house. The truth was partly revealed on March 10, during the live nominations. Host Pedro Bial only told the housemates that there was no immunity up for grabs and continued to hide the fact that Miguel was an actor and not a Gran Hermano housemate.

After that, Miguel left the house promising to Fani (whom he had a brief showmance) that he will wait for her outside, which she replied stating "I loved it all! I will never ever forget it. Not ever".

Housemates
The newbies cast list was unveiled on January 3, 2013.

The veterans cast list was unveiled on January 8, 2013.

(ages stated at time of contest)

Future Appearances
After this season, in 2013, Kelly Baron, from the glass house, appeared in Big Brother VIP from Portugal, she finished in 4th place.
 
In 2016, André Coelho, from the glass house, appeared in Are You The One? Brasil and on De Férias com o Ex Brazil 1 as original cast member.

In 2017, Andressa Ganacin and Nasser Rodrigues appeared as a couple in Power Couple Brasil 2, they finished in 9th place.

In 2017, Yuri Fernandes appeared in A Fazenda 9, he finished in 6th place.

In 2019, Eliéser Ambrósio and Kamilla Salgado appeared as a couple in Power Couple Brasil 4, they originally finished in 10th place, however they comeback to the game and finished in 9th place.

In 2019, André Coelho, from the glass house, appeared with his wife Clara Maia in Power Couple Brasil 4, they finished in 3rd place.

In 2020, André Martinelli appeared on Big Brother Brasil 20 as a model in a activity.

In 2021, André Martinelli appeared in No Limite 5, he finished the competition in 3rd place.

Voting history

 Key
  – Newbies
  – Veterans
  – BBB Bubble housemates

Notes

Have and Have-Nots

Ratings and reception

Brazilian ratings
All numbers are in points and provided by IBOPE.

 Each point represents 60.000 households in São Paulo.

References

External links
 Official Site 

2013 Brazilian television seasons
13